Mathias Peter Møller, commonly known as M.P. Möller or Moeller (29 September 1854 – 13 April 1937), was a prolific pipe-organ builder and businessman. A native of the Danish island of Bornholm, he emigrated to the United States in 1872 and founded the M.P. Moller Pipe Organ Company in Greencastle, Pennsylvania, in 1875. The city of Hagerstown, Maryland, took notice of Möller's early successes and induced him to move his business there in 1881 to help make it a viable business center in Western Maryland. The company remained in business in Hagerstown. until 1992, with hundreds of employees at its peak and a lifetime production of over 12,000 instruments.

History

Möller's earliest instruments were built by industry supply houses under contract, using tracker action to link the organ console to the pipe chests by mechanical means. By 1902 tubular-pneumatic action was used, until by 1919 the company developed its own version of electro-pneumatic action, referred to as pitman action. Möller thought that anybody who wanted a pipe organ should be able to get one. So, the company built many "Portable" (3 ranks of pipes) and "Artiste" instruments (3 to 9 ranks), smaller mass-produced organs which incorporated standard specifications with fewer sets of pipes. Möller organs can be found in churches, synagogues, concert halls, educational institutions, funeral homes, hospital chapels, movie theaters, municipal auditoriums, restaurants, private residences, and social service organizations.

The first major contract that Möller obtained  with the United States service academies was for the instrument in the Cadet Chapel of the United States Military Academy at West Point, New York. This was Möller Opus 1200, dedicated in 1911. The project bid package included an approved organ design of three manuals with pedalboard. The winning bidder was allowed to suggest and implement changes to this design following the contract award. As a result, Möller, as the builder of the organ, got to demonstrate his best practices in the Cadet Chapel organ. Möller remained the primary supplier of additions until after World War II. Today this mostly-Möller organ is the world's largest all-pipe organ in a religious structure, although the First Congregational Church of Los Angeles, California makes a similar claim with its two pipe organs. Möller rebuilt and expanded the Naval Academy Chapel Organ in 1940, and built the organ for the Air Force Academy Chapel in 1963.

In 1944, M. P. Möller Inc. purchased and acquired the staff and assets of Louisville-based organ company Henry Pilcher's Sons, Inc.

Prior to World War II, Möller had been a low-cost supplier. With the end of the war, Möller began to compete somewhat with Aeolian-Skinner for higher-end pipe organs, including the revision of the Skinner organ at Saint Thomas Church (Manhattan) in 1948, although some of Möller's success in this area was due to quicker delivery rather than tonal superiority. One example of Möller's product is the pair of instruments dedicated in 1965 at the Basilica of the National Shrine of the Immaculate Conception in Washington, D.C.  A three-manual organ was installed in the transept and a four-manual in the rear gallery. In the same year, Möller installed the large four-manual organ at St. Paul the Apostle Church in New York City. This instrument, in the church's famously reverberant acoustic, has been celebrated by generations of organists. Virgil Fox recorded The Christmas Album on the Möller at St. Paul the Apostle in 1965. 1966 saw the completion of another large organ in Buffalo, New York's Central Presbytarian Church.

The largest Möller church organ, built as a single new instrument, is installed in Calvary Church, Charlotte, North Carolina, Opus 11739, completed in 1990. Möller also built a large number of theatre organs, often known as the "Möller Deluxe" organ. The company's largest theatre instrument still resides in Atlanta's Fox Theatre, affectionately known as the "Mighty Mo" since 1929.

Möller introduced solid state electronics for console components and other innovations in the 1980s, later than many other competitors. This, coupled with serious labor problems over the years, lagging investments in the plant, and escalation in the cost of fabrication, contributed to the end of the company. In 1992, the last Möller organ was constructed for and installed in the Chapel by the Sea of Fort Myers Beach, Florida. Several investors attempted to revive the company and move it from its ancient factory on Prospect Street in what is now the Hagerstown Historic District, but to no avail. Möller's assets were auctioned off in 1993, including completed and almost-completed consoles, voiced pipes, hardwoods, specialized tools, and the factory building itself. Dozens of churches lost their down-payments and never received their new pipe organs. The Möller name, customer list and archives were purchased from the bankruptcy court in February 1993, by Paul D. Stuck. The new company identified itself as "Möller Organ Company, A Division of King of Instruments, Incorporated." Once the world's largest organbuilding company, Möller had just four organ projects that year, three of which were to refurbish existing organs. Then it finally closed, bringing the long history of the Möller company to an end.

See also

 List of pipe organs

References

American pipe organ builders
Danish musical instrument makers
Danish emigrants to the United States
19th-century Danish artisans
20th-century Danish artisans
People from Bornholm
People from Hagerstown, Maryland
1854 births
1937 deaths
Musical instrument manufacturing companies of the United States